Barbara Herbert, Countess of Powis (24 June 1735 – 12 March 1786), was the wife of General Henry Herbert, 1st Earl of Powis.

Barbara's father, Lord Edward Herbert, was a younger son of William Herbert, 2nd Marquess of Powis; he married Lady Henrietta Waldegrave, but died only a few months after the wedding, in 1734. Barbara was born three months after her father's death, and was fifteen when she married Henry Herbert on 30 March 1751; Henry was in his late forties. Henry was descended from Richard Herbert, 2nd Baron Herbert of Chirbury, and was created Earl of Powis in 1748, following the death without heirs of William Herbert, 3rd Marquess of Powis.

The couple had two children:
 George Edward Henry Arthur Herbert, 2nd Earl of Powis (1755–1801); died unmarried.
 Lady Henrietta Antonia Herbert (1758–1830); married Edward Clive, 2nd Baron Clive, who was later created Earl of Powis, and had issue.

In 1771, shortly before the earl's death, the family seat at Oakly Park was sold to Robert Clive, 1st Baron Clive, and they moved permanently to Powis Castle. A portrait of Barbara by an unknown artist, dated to approximately 1750, is held at Powis Castle, in the care of the National Trust.

References

1735 births
1786 deaths
British countesses
Herbert family
18th-century British women